Protection and Guard Service (abbreviated SPP) is the Romanian institution designated to protect and defend dignitaries, as well as their family or close relatives. The institution operates independently, although it collaborates closely with the Romanian Ministry of National Defense and other secret services. Its motto is Semper Fidelis.

Activity
SPP is a vital institution for the national security. It operates under Law 191/1998. The institution and its employees are mainly required to:

 Defend dignitaries and their families, within legal limitations
 Defend diplomats and heads of state during their stay in Romania (including airspace, water and the additional islands)
 Defend the residences of the above-mentioned category
 Defend any premises in which the above-stated category is visiting

The institution must respect all laws, as well as the Constitution. The institution takes orders and fulfills requests given by the Supreme Council of National Defense.

History
The institution has been officially operating since May 7, 1990. The concept of such a service came up right after the fall of the communist regime. 
Along the years, the institution has been keeping a low-profile, with little information available about it.

See also
 Secţia Intervenţii Anti-Teroriste, the special unit of the Protection and Guard Service
 5th Directorate of the Securitate, the department of the Securitate charged with the same tasks during the communist regime

References

External links
  Official site

 
Protective security units
Romanian intelligence agencies